Polycaoninae is a subfamily of horned powder-post beetles in the family Bostrichidae. There are at least 2 genera and 20 described species in Polycaoninae.

References

Bibliography

External links

Polycaoninae at Fauna Europaea
 
 

Bostrichidae